The ABP Newport Wales Marathon is a marathon race held in the Welsh city of Newport, Wales, taking place in May. The event was established in 2018, started by national race organisers Run4Wales.

Background 
The title sponsor is Associated British Ports, the operator of South Wales' ports including Newport Docks. The first race in 2018 saw nearly 10,000 runners take part in both the marathon (3,444 finishers) and the 10K version (2,576 finishers).  Local sports body Newport Now has estimated that the 2018 race brought £1.1m to the local economy.

The course is known as particularly flat, and flatter than its sister race, the Admiral City of Newport Half Marathon. It was designed by Welsh Olympian Steve Brace. Wales' most successful sprinter, Christian Malcolm, is also involved with pre-race events and a warm-up prior to the race.

Route 
The Half Marathon held in March follows the National Cycle Network Route 88 path to the historic Roman fortress town of Caerleon (Isca Augusta), and through Caerleon Road.

In contrast the Marathon and 10K go south of the city, over the City Bridge to Coronation Park and the Grade 1-listed Transporter Bridge. The marathon continues on to the particularly flat land around the coast of eastern Newport, towards Llanwern, Goldcliff and Magor, mostly former or current marshlands with firm road conditions and flat terrain.

Organisers describe the event as one of the UK's flattest with over 70% of participants claiming a personal best in 2018.

Organisation 

Sponsors include the Welsh Government, the UK Office for National Statistics, the University of South Wales, Newport City Council and the city retail centre Friars Walk.

Event history 
There was no marathon in 2020. Entries for that year were deferred to next year.

2019 event 
It was announced in May 2018 that the event would return, with the 2019 marathon and 10K would take place for the second time on 5 May 2019. Tata Steel were announced as a new sponsor and the Family Mile would also resume in 2019. Entry was priced at an early rate of £45, and £40 for Welsh Athletics affiliated runners.

2018 result

Marathon 
The inaugural ABP Newport Marathon took place on 29 April 2018.

The winner was Neath Harriers' James Carpenter with a time of 2:33:31. The fastest female was Natasha Cockram of Mickey Morris Racing Team with a time of 2:44:58.

The marathon saw a wide range of participants, from one of the oldest runners, 80 year old Sydney Wheeler of Chepstow Harriers, to former boxer Matthew Edmonds. A separate Family Mile also took place.

10K 
Cardiff AAC's Ieuan Thomas won the 10K with a time of 00:29:43, and Shaftesbury Barnet Harriers' Rachel Felton was the fastest female with a time of 00:35:03.

References

External links 

 The official website of the ABP Newport Marathon
 TDL Event Services - Newport Marathon results

Athletics competitions in Wales
Marathons in the United Kingdom
Sport in Newport, Wales
Recurring sporting events established in 2018
Spring (season) events
2018 establishments in Wales
Events in Newport, Wales
Annual events in Wales
Athletics races in Newport